Zhukov or Zhukova (feminine) is a common Russian surname, derived from the word "жук" (beetle, bug), and may also refer to:

 Anastasia Zhukova
 Anatoly Zhukov (1901–?), Soviet forestry expert and academician
 Boris Zhukov, professional wrestling name of Jim Barrell
 Dasha Zhukova (born 1981), Russian fashion designer
 Georgy Zhukov (footballer) (born 1994), Kazakh footballer 
 Georgy Zhukov (1896–1974), Soviet military commander and politician
 Igor Zhukov (1936–2018), Russian pianist, conductor and sound engineer
 Inna Zhukova (born 1986), Belarusian individual rhythmic gymnast
 Ivan Zhukov (1880–1949), Russian chemist
 Ivan Yefimovich Zhukov (1934–2021), military pilot and Hero of the Soviet Union
 Klim Zhukov (born 1977), Russian medievalist historian, science fiction author, vlogger, and historical reenactor.
 Sergeant Sergei Zhukov, a recurring character in the television series JAG
 Maria Zhukova (1804–1855), Russian writer
 Mykyta Zhukov (born 1995), Ukrainian football player
 Natalia Zhukova (born 1979), Ukrainian Woman Grandmaster of chess
 Rimma Zhukova (1925–1999), Russian speed skater
 Sergei Nikolayevich Zhukov (born 1967), Soviet and Russian footballer
 Sergei Zhukov (ice hockey) (born 1975), Russian ice hockey player
 Sergey Zhukov (born 1976), musician with the group Ruki Vverh!
 Vasily Zhukov (born 1947), member of the Russian Academy of Sciences
 Yegor Zhukov (born 1998), a Russian political activist, journalist and radio host 
 Yevgeni Zhukov (1950–1990), Soviet footballer
 Yuri Zhukov (historian) (1938–2023), Russian historian
 Yuri Zhukov (journalist) (1908–1991), journalist, editor and observer of the newspaper Pravda, third chairman of the Soviet Peace Committee

See also 
 Zhukovsky (surname)
 Żukowski

Slavic-language surnames
Russian-language surnames